Amyris of Sybaris in Italy, surnamed "the Wise", whose son was one of the suitors of Agariste of Sicyon, at the beginning of the sixth century BCE. Amyris was sent by his fellow-citizens to consult the Delphic oracle. His reputation for wisdom gave rise to the proverb , "the wise man is mad".

Notes

6th-century BC Greek people
Italiotes